Pechersk is a historical neighborhood in the city center of Kyiv, the capital of Ukraine. It is a part of the administrative Pechersk Raion (district). Pechersk is located between the Lypky, Klov and Dnieper hills. Its main streets are Ivan Mazepa Street, Dmytro Godzenko Street, and Lesya Ukrainka Boulevard.

History
Its name comes from the caves of Kyiv Pechersk Lavra (founded in 1051) existing since ancient times. The settlement began to emerge in the 12th century as the Pechersk Lavra settlement including areas around the former village of Berestove. In 16-17th century, Pechersk was a town.

Construction of Old Cave Castle (the administrative center of Kyiv) began in the 1st half of the 18th century followed by New Pechersk fortress 30 - 40 years later. In the 19th century, the settlement included the former settlement Vasylkivski Rogatky.

Pechersk name can be found in the  Raion, Square, Descent, Boulevard (now Lesya Ukrainka Boulevard), Street (no longer exists) and Novopecherska Street (no longer exists). Now Pechersk preserves monuments of architecture from the  Kievan Rus era and later centuries.

Gallery

External links
 

Neighborhoods in Kyiv
Hills of Kyiv
Pecherskyi District